The Dampier Peninsula monitor or Dampier Peninsula goanna (Varanus sparnus), described in 2014, is the smallest known species of monitor lizard, growing up to 16.3 grams with a length of almost 23 cm and a SVL (snout to vent length) of 116 mm. It is believed to live only on the Dampier Peninsula of the Kimberley region north of Broome and Derby in Western Australia. It is highly active, making it difficult to photograph in the wild. It has short legs, an elongate body, a reddish-brown back with widely scattered black spots and "a ridged, circular and short prehensile tail.""sparnos is Greek for 'rare' or 'scarce' in reference to this species' isolation and small range on the Dampier Peninsula. Latinised to sparnus, and used as an adjective".

Taxonomy
Described in 2014 and assigned to the genus Varanus, lizards known as monitors and goannas. The specimens were obtained in a location at the Dampier Peninsula in 2009.

Description
The smallest species of extant varanid.

Distribution
Restricted to rocky habitat in the northwest of Western Australia.

Footnotes

References
 "A new diminutive species of Varanus from the Dampier Peninsula, western Kimberley region, Western Australia." Paul Doughty, Luke Kealley, Alison Fitch and Stephen C. Donnellan. Records of the Western Australian Museum 29, pp. 128–140 (2014). PDF file downloadable at:  MANUSCRIPT RECEIVED 31 OCTOBER 2014; ACCEPTED 31 OCTOBER 2014
 ‘Eureka’ moment with discovery of new Dampier Peninsula goanna species AAP December 30, 2014
 World’s smallest goanna lizard species discovered in the Kimberley region Di Yarrall, Western Australian Museum Created 30 Dec 2014
 Discovery of a new species of goanna lizard from the Kimberley Western Australian Museum updated 7 Jan 2015

Varanus
Reptiles of the Northern Territory
Reptiles of Western Australia
Kimberley (Western Australia)
Reptiles described in 2014
Monitor lizards of Australia